War Pinball is an iOS pinball game developed by Russian studio OOO Gameprom and released on March 20, 2011.

Critical reception
The game has a Metacritic score of 85% based on 7 critic reviews.

Modojo said "OK, so War Pinball looks and sounds outstanding, but how does it play? Perfect. In-game missions, smooth play and tight controls put it in a whole other league. The fact that it runs without a hitch with the ball zipping all over the place is impressive, no question. " SlideToPlay deemed it "A Must Have app for any portable pinball wizard." 148Apps said "Gameprom is back doing what they have proven themselves proficient at time and time again: making stellar pinball games. " IGN noted "The ball physics are fast, smooth, and reliable. If you fancy yourself a digital pinball wizard, grab this download. " Gamezebo said "Everything you loved about their previous effort is back, and the tables are even better than before. If you're a fan of video game pinball, it's time to soldier up; looks like you're going to war. " TouchArcade wrote "While all of Gameprom's pinball games are very good, War Pinball is definitely the cream of the crop. If you're already of fan of their previous work, this latest game is an easy purchase decision as it contains 3 fun new tables that make great use of their movie licenses. " Pocketgamer UK said "War Pinball looks and sounds fantastic, but there's still room for improvement when it comes to table design. "

References

2011 video games
Android (operating system) games
Pinball video games
IOS games
Video games developed in Russia